Yana P'unqu (Quechua yana black, p'unqu pond, reservoir, tank; dam, "black pond", also spelled Yanapunco) is mountain Cordillera Central in the Andes of Peru which reaches a height of approximately  . It is located in the Lima Region, Yauyos Province,  Laraos District. Yana P'unqu lies north of a lake named Pumaqucha.

References 

Mountains of Lima Region
Mountains of Peru